Audrey Cameron is a polymer chemist working at the University of Edinburgh. She is Deaf and uses British Sign Language.

Biography
Cameron gained her degree in chemistry from the University of West of Scotland before achieving a PhD in Chemistry from the University of Strathclyde with a thesis on hydrogel polymer membranes. She then carried out her postdoctoral research at both Strathclyde and Durham Universities, before completing a PGCE course in Secondary Education (Chemistry with Science) at the Moray House School of Education and Sport in 2004, after which she spent some time teaching Chemistry and Science in mainstream schools.

Currently, she is a Chancellor's Fellow in Science Education (Chemistry) on the PGDE Secondary Education (Chemistry/ General Science) course and she delivers science workshops for the PGDE Primary Education course. She also delivers the Deaf Studies module as part of the MSc Inclusive Education team. In 2020 she was awarded a five-year Chancellor’s Fellowship, focusing on research on science education and BSL.

Cameron also manages the Scottish Sensory Centre's BSL Glossary project. This project, which has been active since 2007, aims at developing a glossary of British signs and definitions to cover STEM disciplines and support teaching of such subjects to Deaf pupils. The glossary has nearly 3,500 signs with BSL definitions and examples. Each sign and definition is developed by a team of Deaf scientists, mathematicians, teachers working with deaf children, and BSL sign linguists, in order to be correct both linguistically and scientifically, and to be effective in conveying a concept.

In 2016, Cameron was selected to be part of the exhibition "175 Faces of Chemistry", which showcased the diversity of the chemistry profession through 175 stories of individuals working in chemistry and organised by the Royal Society of Chemistry in the lead up of the 175th anniversary of its foundation.

References

External links

Scottish deaf people
BSL users
Alumni of the University of the West of Scotland
Alumni of the University of Strathclyde
Living people
Year of birth missing (living people)
Polymer scientists and engineers